Helen Lokuta (born 12 April 1975 in Tartu) is an Estonian opera singer (mezzo-soprano).

In 2014, she finished her master's studies at Estonian Academy of Music and Theatre.

Since 2004, she has participated in Tõnu Kaljuste's project Nargen Opera. Since 2006, she is working as a soloist at Estonian National Opera.

Awards
 1994 1st prize in Estonian Youth Singers Competition
 2005 2nd prize in International vocalists competition in Lithuanian Academy of Music and Theatre
 2005 Young Musician of the Year from the Pille Lill Music Fund
 2007 Annual Prize of Estonian Teatre Union

Roles

 Georges Bizet "Carmen" (Carmen)
 Rimskij-Korsakov "Tsaari Mõrsja" ( Ljubaša)
 Giuseppe Verdi "La Traviata" (Flora)
 Pjotr Tšaikovski "Padaemand" (Polina)

References

Living people
1975 births
21st-century Estonian women opera singers